Air Ambulance Kent Surrey Sussex (KSS) is an organisation providing emergency medical services through the provision of a helicopter air ambulance covering the four English counties of Kent, Surrey, East Sussex and West Sussex, which are served by the South East Coast Ambulance Service.  The service is funded by the Kent, Surrey & Sussex Air Ambulance Trust which is a registered charity, raising money from public and private donations in excess of £15million every year.
The charity's aircraft are based and maintained at Redhill Aerodrome in Surrey. Its headquarters and forward operating base are at Rochester Airport in Kent.

Operations
The charity's vision is "We envision a society where no one dies following sudden, preventable unexpected trauma or medical emergency" and its stated purpose is "We save lives and improve outcomes by bringing the best pre-hospital care to critical patients wherever they are, whenever they need it."
The charity provides air ambulance cover for the all four counties, in association with the South East Coast Ambulance Service.

KSS currently operates three helicopters, two AgustaWestland AW169 G-KSST since 2017 and G-KSSC since 2018, plus a MD 902 Explorer G-KSSA, which is used as a backup.
The helicopters can reach any area of the four counties within a 25-minute flight.
Two previous MD 902 Explorers (G-KAAT, G-KSSH) served the trust throughout the 2000s. 

In addition to the helicopters, there are four rapid response vehicles (RRV), one Volvo XC70 and three Volvo XC90, which are used when circumstances mean that the helicopters cannot operate.
The charity previously had a rapid response car that was donated in May 2009 by Sussex Police, having formerly been one of their traffic patrol vehicles.

, KSS have attended 30,000 incidents since their inception in 1989.

KSS mostly relies on voluntary donations to meet its running costs.
In the year ending March 2022, the charity raised income of £17.6million, including £2.1M from government contracts. It spent £16.6M, of which £12.4M was used to operate the charitable service.
Most of the doctors and paramedics are employed by the NHS and military. In 2020, the service paid £800,000 (from a total cost of £1M) for onboard doctors and £880,000 (from a total cost of £1.46M) for paramedics and NHS clinical managers.

History
KSS, an expansion of the existing Kent Air Ambulance service, went into operation in 2007, 
covering the two counties of Sussex and Surrey.

On 30 October 2015, it was announced that the charity would invest £10M in relocating its flying base near Paddock Wood.

In 2017, one of the three MD 902 Explorer helicopters (G-KAAT) was retired after over 17 years of service for the trust and replaced by a new AgustaWestland AW169 helicopter capable of night time flights, giving KSS a 24-hour capability.

In 2018, a second AW169 (G-KSSC) entered service. This caused the service establish a forward operating base at Rochester Airport, to accommodate the larger helicopter, alongside the existing base at Redhill Aerodrome. The arrival of the new AW169 promoted the rebranding and name change of the charity.

In late 2019, an MD 902 (G-KSSH) was retired and sold after 12 years of service with the charity. The remaining MD 902 (G-KSSA) is used as a backup helicopter for when the AW169 machines are out of service for maintenance.

Kent Air Ambulance 

The Kent Air Ambulance Trust became a registered charity established in 1989, serving only Kent. The trust was founded by Kate Chivers, and was originally called the South East Thames Air Ambulance.
It initially operated on a part-time basis, but became a seven-day service in January 2000. Shortly afterwards it moved from Rochester Airport to a new base at Marden near Maidstone.

It operated one McDonnell Douglas MD 902 Explorer helicopter, registration G-KAAT, from its headquarters in Marden.

Sussex joint Police Air Operations Unit & Air Ambulance 
The MD 902, G-SUSX, was crewed by a pilot, a Sussex Police air observer, who was a sworn police officer and a paramedic seconded from South East Coast Ambulance Service, who was also trained as an air observer.

Under the now KSSAAT, the Sussex-based helicopter also served Surrey – creating Air Ambulance Kent Surrey Sussex.

See also
 Air ambulances in the United Kingdom

References

External links 

 
 

Air ambulance services in England